Team Coop–Repsol is a UCI Continental cycling team based in Norway. It is managed by Jan Erik Fjotland with the help of Magnus Børresen, Edward de Weerdt and Gilbert de Weerdt.

Team roster

Major wins

2005
 Road Race Championships, Morten Christiansen
Stage 5 FBD Insurance Rás, Morten Christiansen
Stage 7 FBD Insurance Rás, Morten Hegreberg
Ringerike GP, Are Andresen
2006
Stage 9 FBD Insurance Ras, Morten Hegreberg
Overall Grand Prix Cycliste de Gemenc, Martin Prázdnovský
Prologue (ITT) & Stage 2, Martin Prázdnovský
Overall Tour de Guadeloupe, Martin Prázdnovský
2008
Stage 2 Tour des Pyrénées, Stian Remme
2009
Rogaland GP, Haavard Nybö
2010
 Road Race Championships, Michael Stevenson
Stage 1 Tour des Pyrénées, Roy Hegreberg
Stage 4 Tour des Pyrénées, Filip Eidsheim
2011
Stage 2a Vuelta Ciclista a León, Daniel Jarsto
2012
Eschborn-Frankfurt City Loop U23, Sven Erik Bystrøm
Kernen Omloop Echt-Susteren, Daniel Hoelgaard
2013
Hadeland GP, Fredrik Strand Galta
2014
UCI World Under-23 Road Race Championships, Sven Erik Bystrøm
 Road Race Championships, Tormod Hausken Jacobsen
2015
GP Viborg, Oscar Landa
Overall Kreiz Breizh Elites, August Jensen
Stages 2 & 3, Fredrik Strand Galta
Stage 4, August Jensen
2016
Overall GP Liberty Seguros, August Jensen
Stage 1, August Jensen
2017
Stage 1 East Bohemia Tour, Krister Hagen
Stage 5 Tour du Loir et Cher, August Jensen
Stages 3 & 4 Oberösterreichrundfahrt, August Jensen
Stage 3 Arctic Race of Norway, August Jensen
2018
Trofej Umag, Krister Hagen
Overall Istrian Spring Trophy, Krister Hagen
Scandinavian Race in Uppsala, Trond Trondsen
Memorial Philippe Van Coningsloo, Gustav Höög
Hansa Bygg Kalmar Grand Prix Road Race, Gustav Höög
2019
Stage 6 Tour de Normandie, Trond Trondsen
Sundvolden GP, Trond Trondsen
Stage 1 Tour d'Eure-et-Loir, Trond Trondsen
2021
 Overall International Tour of Rhodes, Fredrik Dversnes
International Rhodes Grand Prix, Tord Gudmestad
Stage 1 Dookoła Mazowsza, Eirik Lunder
Stages 2 & 3 Dookoła Mazowsza, Tord Gudmestad
Puchar Ministra Obrony Narodowej, Louis Bendixen
2022
International Rhodes Grand Prix, André Drege
 Overall International Tour of Rhodes, Louis Bendixen
Stages 1 & 2, Louis Bendixen
Stage 2 Tour du Loir-et-Cher, Andreas Stokbro

See also
List of UCI professional continental and continental teams

References

External links

 
 UCI profile

UCI Continental Teams (Europe)
Cycling teams based in Norway
Cycling teams established in 2004